Pavel Rychetský (born 17 August 1943) is a Czech lawyer and former politician who is the 3rd and current President of the Constitutional Court of the Czech Republic. The Senate confirmed him on 16 July 2003 and on 6 August 2003 he was sworn in by President Václav Klaus and reappointed in 2013 by President Miloš Zeman.

Before joining the Constitutional Court, Rychetský was the Minister of Justice and Chairman of the Legislative Council from 15 July 2002 to 5 August 2003 and also Senator from Strakonice from 1996 to 2003. Between 1998 and 2002 he served as vice president of Miloš Zeman's government.

Previously, he had a private law practice and held positions in the Government since early 1990s.

Rychetský was awarded the Légion d'honneur on 12 July 2005.

External links 
 Official biography
 

1943 births
Living people
Charter 77 signatories
Constitutional Court of the Czech Republic judges
Charles University alumni
Justice ministers of the Czech Republic
Czech Social Democratic Party Senators
Recipients of the Legion of Honour
Communist Party of Czechoslovakia politicians
Judges from Prague
Politicians from Prague
Czech Social Democratic Party Government ministers
Civic Movement Government ministers
Recipients of the Order of Tomáš Garrigue Masaryk, 1st class